Burton Township is one of the sixteen townships of Geauga County, Ohio, United States. As of the 2020 census the population was 4,379, of whom 2,964 lived in the unincorporated portions of the township.

Geography
Located in the central part of the county, it borders the following townships:
Claridon Township - north
Huntsburg Township - northeast corner
Middlefield Township - east
Parkman Township - southeast corner
Troy Township - south
Auburn Township - southwest corner
Newbury Township - west
Munson Township - northwest corner

The village of Burton is located in central Burton Township.

Name and history
Burton Township was established in 1806, and named after Titus Burton, the son of a first settler. It is the only Burton Township statewide.

Government
The township is governed by a five-member board of trustees, who are elected in November of odd-numbered years to a four-year term beginning on the following January 1. Two are elected in the year after the presidential election and one is elected in the year before it. There is also an elected township fiscal officer, who serves a four-year term beginning on April 1 of the year after the election, which is held in November of the year before the presidential election. Vacancies in the fiscal officership or on the board of trustees are filled by the remaining trustees.

References

External links
Burton Township official website
County website

Townships in Geauga County, Ohio
Townships in Ohio